Osvaldo Juan Zubeldía (24 June 1927 in Junín –  17 January 1982 in Medellín) was a football player and an influential Argentine coach.

Playing career

Zubeldía had a respectable playing career with Vélez Sársfield, Boca Juniors, Atlanta and Banfield and the Argentina national football team. He was known as an intelligent player who was always well positioned on the field. His legacy, however, would come from his career as a manager.

Managerial career

Early career

His managing career started at Atlanta between 1961 and 1963, he led the team to two respectable finishes in the league. He then had an unsuccessful stint on the managing team of the Argentina national team in 1965.

Estudiantes

His managerial career took off with Estudiantes de La Plata. He was hired by the club in 1965 to help the team stave off relegation; he combined many prospects from Estudiantes' la tercera que mata ("the killer juveniles") with a small number of outside talent, and built one of the most successful teams in the history of Argentine football.

The first championship of the so-called "Golden Era" came in 1967, when Estudiantes became the first "small" team to win an Argentine championship. The team came back from three goals down to beat Platense in the semifinal 4–3, then took the crown with a convincing 3–0 victory over Racing Club.

Estudiantes then took second place in the Nacional championship, qualifying for the 1968 Copa Libertadores, which Estudiantes won after defeating Brazilian side Palmeiras.

In that year's Intercontinental Cup, Estudiantes defeated Bobby Charlton's Manchester United 1–0 in Buenos Aires, and achieved a 1–1 tie at Old Trafford on 16 October 1968. The Intercontinental title remains the highest achievement in Estudiantes' history.

The team would go on to win the Copa Libertadores twice more, in 1969 against Nacional from Uruguay and in 1970 against Peñarol also from Uruguay.

Estudiantes lost their Intercontinental Cup finals to A.C. Milan and Feyenoord, respectively, but they did win the less prestigious Copa Interamericana in 1969.

1974–1982
In 1974, Zubeldía coached the San Lorenzo de Almagro team that won the Nacional title. He also won two Colombian League titles with Atlético Nacional in 1976 and 1981.

On 17 January 1982 Zubeldía died of a heart attack in Medellín, Colombia at the age of 54, while setting a bet on horse race.

Tactics
Zubeldía was a harbinger of tactical changes; he was the first manager to thoroughly research rival team's tactics and playing style. Pre-planned plays off free kicks and tactical fouls to stop rival advances were highly criticized at the time, but have since been adopted by virtually every team in the world. So are other practices, like the offside trap (having the defense step forward in sync to force opposing players into an offside position) and using screens at corner kicks.

Legacy
Zubeldía's legacy was carried to fruition by the key tactical player of his Estudiantes, Carlos Bilardo, who went on to become one of the most successful coaches in Argentine history. Bilardo dedicated to his mentor both the 1982 Metropolitano title won by Estudiantes and the 1986 FIFA World Cup title won by Argentina.

External links
 Estudiantes profile
 The glory in Atletico Nacional, 1981

1927 births
1982 deaths
People from Junín, Buenos Aires
Argentine people of Basque descent
Sportspeople from Buenos Aires Province
Argentine footballers
Club Atlético Vélez Sarsfield footballers
Boca Juniors footballers
Club Atlético Atlanta footballers
Club Atlético Banfield footballers
Argentine Primera División players
Argentine football managers
Argentina national football team managers
Estudiantes de La Plata managers
Club Atlético Huracán managers
San Lorenzo de Almagro managers
Atlético Nacional managers
Association football forwards